Kavala Island (Île Kavala) is an island in Lake Tanganyika in central Africa. It had a lighthouse by the late 19th century. The London Missionary Society set up a mission there in 1882, relocating from Ujiji, becoming its Central African Mission. It is a possession of the Democratic Republic of the Congo (DRC).

References

NGA Geonames database, feature ID -2047539

Sources
 
 
 

Islands of the Democratic Republic of the Congo
Lake islands of Africa